Khlong Song Ton Nun is a khwaeng (subdistrict) of Lat Krabang District, in Bangkok, Thailand. In 2019, it had a total population of 68,026 people.

References

Subdistricts of Bangkok
Lat Krabang district